Kyabra County, Queensland is a cadastral division of Queensland and a County of the South Gregory District of south western Queensland.  

The county is divided into civil  parishes.

History
The County is traditional lands of the Gungadidji and Kulumali.
Patrick Durack established Cattle Stations in the County in 1868

The county came into existence on 8 March 1901, when the Governor of Queensland issued a proclamation legally dividing Queensland into counties under the Land Act 1897.
Like all counties in Queensland, it is a non-functional administrative unit, that is used mainly for the purpose of registering land titles. From 30 November 2015, the government no longer referenced counties and parishes in land information systems however the Museum of Lands, Mapping and Surveying retains a record for historical purposes.

Geography
The center of local government for the county is Jundah, Queensland to the west and the postal code is 4481.
The county is named for the Kyabra Creek that flows through the county.
The economy is based on Agriculture and 'Oil and Gas extraction'.

References 

Counties of Queensland